Rodinei Marcelo de Almeida (born 29 January 1992), simply known as Rodinei, is a Brazilian footballer who plays as a right back for Super League Greece club Olympiacos.

Club career

Early career
Born in Tatuí, São Paulo, Rodinei was orphan at the age of only ten. He started his career at the age of 17 with Videira Esporte Clube in the second division of the Campeonato Catarinense, and subsequently moved to Porto União.

In 2011, Rodinei joined Avaí and was initially assigned to the under-20s. Ahead of the 2012 season, he was loaned to Marcílio Dias for the year's Catarinense.

On 22 May 2012, Rodinei joined Corinthians on loan for one year. A third-choice behind Alessandro and Guilherme Andrade, he made his Série A debut on 17 October, coming on as a late substitute for Willian Arão in a 2–0 away loss against Cruzeiro; it was his only appearance for the club.

On 3 May 2013, Rodinei extended his contract with Avaí and was immediately loaned to CRAC until the end of the year, being a regular starter in the club's Série C run. He then moved to Penapolense also in a temporary deal for the 2014 Campeonato Paulista, being an undisputed first-choice as his side reached the quarterfinals of the competition.

Ponte Preta
On 1 July 2014, Rodinei signed for Ponte Preta on loan until the end of the year. He scored his first professional goal in only his second match for the club, in a 2–0 home defeat of Joinville for the Série B championship.

Rodinei contributed with two goals in 22 appearances for the side during his first year, helping in their top tier promotion. On 11 December 2014, he agreed to a new one-year contract with Ponte. During the 2015 season, he was again an undisputed starter, only missing three league matches as his side achieved a comfortable 11th place.

Flamengo
On 10 December 2015, Flamengo announced the signing of Rodinei for the 2016 season. He made his debut for the club on 30 January, starting in a 1–1 Campeonato Carioca home draw against Boavista.

On 17 July 2018, after sharing starts with Pará, Rodinei extended his contract with Flamengo until December 2022.

Internacional (loan)
On 23 December 2019 Flamengo agreed to loan Rodinei to Internacional until the end of the 2020 season with a option to buy at the end of the loan set at €4 million.

Olympiacos
On 11 December 2022 Olympiacos announced the signing of Rodinei on  a 2.5 years contract.

Career statistics

Club

Honours
Flamengo
Copa Libertadores: 2019, 2022
Campeonato Brasileiro Série A: 2019
Campeonato Carioca: 2017, 2019
Copa do Brasil: 2022
Individual
Campeonato Carioca Team of the Year: 2016

References

External links

1992 births
Living people
Brazilian footballers
Association football defenders
Campeonato Brasileiro Série A players
Campeonato Brasileiro Série B players
Campeonato Brasileiro Série C players
Avaí FC players
Clube Náutico Marcílio Dias players
Sport Club Corinthians Paulista players
Clube Atlético Penapolense players
Associação Atlética Ponte Preta players
CR Flamengo footballers
Sport Club Internacional players
Olympiacos F.C. players
People from Tatuí
Footballers from São Paulo (state)
Brazilian expatriate footballers
Brazilian expatriate sportspeople in Greece
Expatriate footballers in Greece